Second Presbyterian Church of Memphis, Tennessee is a historic congregation, in the Evangelical Presbyterian Church, located at 4055 Poplar Avenue.  Its former 1891 building is listed on the National Register of Historic Places but was sold by the congregation in 1952 when it moved to its current location.  The present building was designed by Walter H. Thomas and Harold E. Wagoner, and received the Second Award for Large Churches from the Church Architectural Guild of America .

References

External links
Official website

Churches in Memphis, Tennessee
Presbyterian churches in Tennessee
Evangelical Presbyterian churches
Presbyterian megachurches in the United States
Megachurches in Tennessee
Churches completed in 1952